Thomas Aquinas College is a Private Roman Catholic liberal arts college with its main campus in Ventura County, California. A second campus opened in Northfield, Massachusetts in 2018.  Its education is based on the Great Books and seminar method. It is accredited by the WASC Senior College and University Commission. It is endorsed by The Newman Guide to Choosing a Catholic College.

In December 2017 the Thomas wildfire, the largest of the season's wildfires, started near, and was named after, the college.

Academics
Thomas Aquinas offers one degree program: Bachelor of Arts in Liberal Arts.

As a matter of principle, to ensure the institution's autonomy, the school does not accept any direct government funding; neither does it receive funding from the Catholic Church.  Rather, it offers need-based scholarships funded by the private donations of individuals and foundations.

In 2012, the American Council of Trustees and Alumni included Thomas Aquinas College in its What Will They Learn? study, which   assigns a letter grade to 1,070 universities based on how many of the following seven core subjects are required, according to its specific criteria : composition, literature, foreign language, American history, economics, mathematics, and science. Thomas Aquinas College was one of 21 schools to receive an "A" grade, a grade assigned to schools that include at least six of the seven subjects.

Curriculum
Thomas Aquinas offers one degree, a Bachelor of Arts in liberal arts.  This is an integrated liberal arts curriculum made up primarily of the Great Books of the Western Tradition, with order of learning emphasized in the structure of the curriculum. Much of the first two years of the four-year program is devoted to the Trivium (logic, rhetoric, and grammar) and the Quadrivium (geometry, astronomy, arithmetic, and music.) Natural science, philosophy, and theology are studied all four years. Over the first three years, a total of eleven papers are assigned in the various subject areas throughout the year—"Five essays are written in  freshman year, four sophomore year, and two lengthier essays are written in junior year." In their fourth-year, students produce a senior thesis and defend it before a panel of faculty members.

The college replaces textbooks with original sources, the seminal works in all the major disciplines.  Thomas Aquinas College acknowledges that not all texts in their program are of equal weight. They regard some as masterworks and others as sources of opinions that "either lead students to the truth, or make the truth more evident by opposition to it."  Students read some texts in their entirety and only excerpts from others.

The college's St. Vincent de Paul Lecture and Concert Series complements its regular academic program, providing events at least once a month during the academic year.

Student life

Three chaplain-priests live on campus. They provide the sacraments and spiritual direction.

Intramural sports throughout the year include volleyball, soccer, football, basketball, ultimate, and baseball. The St. John Paul II athletic center is home to both male and female exercise rooms, a rock-climbing wall, a lap swimming pool, outdoor tennis and basketball courts, and an indoor gymnasium. The athletic center is the newest building on the California campus, opening its doors in early 2022.

The St. Genesius players produce one play a year, commonly a selection from Shakespeare.  The College Choir presents an annual concert and a spring musical, often a production of Gilbert and Sullivan. It sings at Sunday Mass and special events. Another student choir and various instrumentalists and vocalists in the student body provide informal recitals throughout the year, at formal and informal events.

Unmarried students are housed on-campus in six dormitories. Married students may live off-campus. Men's and women's residence halls are off-limits to members of the opposite sex.

The possession or use of alcohol or illegal drugs on campus or in the dormitories is not allowed and may entail expulsion from the college.

Chapel
 As the “crown jewel” of the Thomas Aquinas College campus, Our Lady of the Most Holy Trinity Chapel was dedicated on March 7, 2009. The design for this , $23 million building employs Early Christian, Renaissance, and Spanish Mission styles. Designed by the New Classical architect Duncan Stroik, it is cruciform in shape and features both a  bell tower and an  dome. Pope John Paul II blessed the chapel's plans in 2003, and in 2008, Pope Benedict XVI blessed its cornerstone. Adoremus Bulletin has called Our Lady of the Most Holy Trinity Chapel “A Triumph of Sacred Architecture.”

Library

The ceiling of the college's Saint Bernardine of Siena Library has been constructed with a 17th-century Spanish monastery Spanish ceiling. The library has a collection of rarities, including thousands-year old Hittite seals, and devotional and sacred objects of saints.

New England Campus 
Beginning in the Fall 2019 semester, Thomas Aquinas College has operated on an additional campus in Northfield, Massachusetts. Both campuses are under the authority of the same governing board and follow the same curriculum, but each campus has its own unique cultures due to their geography. The New England campus formerly belonged to Northfield Mount Hermon School, a preparatory school that moved to another campus in 2005 and was given to Thomas Aquinas College in 2017 by the National Christian Foundation. The campus is located near the Connecticut River, and includes 100 acres of land, residence halls, a library, gymnasium, a chapel, and plenty of classroom and administrative space.

Notable alumni

 Thomas Alexander (1999), Deputy Assistant Secretary of Defense for Counter Narcotics and Global Threats
 The Very Rev. John Berg (1993), former Superior General of the Priestly Fraternity of Saint Peter
 Samantha Cohoe (2007), author of A Golden Fury and Bright Ruined Things
 Pia de Solenni (1993), theologian who formerly served as the chancellor of the Roman Catholic Diocese of Orange
 Marie George (1979), natural philosopher and cosmologist
 Peter Kwasniewski (1994), traditionalist Catholic writer and composer of sacred music.
 John Mortensen (1997), recipient of the Prize of the Pontifical Academies in 2010 and President of The Aquinas Institute, which is publishing the Opera Omnia of St Thomas Aquinas in bilingual Latin/English editions
 Mary Bridget Neumayr (1986), chairman of the White House Council on Environmental Quality
 Rev. Sebastian Walshe, O.Praem. (1994), author of Understanding Marriage & Family: A Catholic Perspective and Secrets from Heaven: Hidden Treasures of Faith in the Parables and Conversations of Jesus
 Michael Waldstein (1977), theologian and specialist in ancient Gnosticism, the Gospel of John, and the work of John Paul II, translator and commentator on Man and Woman He Created Them: A Theology of the Body and author of Glory of the Logos in the Flesh: Saint John Paul's Theology of the Body

See also
Great Books
Thomas More College of Liberal Arts
St. John's College
Shimer College
Wyoming Catholic College

References

External links

 Official website

Liberal arts colleges in California
Catholic universities and colleges in California
Santa Paula, California
Universities and colleges in Ventura County, California
Schools accredited by the Western Association of Schools and Colleges
1971 establishments in California
Educational institutions established in 1971
New Classical architecture